Lookin' Back at Myself is the fourth studio album from American country music artist Aaron Tippin. It was released in 1994 via RCA Records Nashville. The album includes the singles "I Got It Honest" and "She Feels Like a Brand New Man Tonight," both of which entered the country music charts; respectively, they peaked at #15 and #39. "Country Boy's Tool Box" later appeared on Tippin's next album, Tool Box.

Track listing

Personnel
Musicians
 Dennis Burnside - piano
 Stuart Duncan - fiddle
 Paul Franklin - pedal steel guitar
 Steve Gibson - electric guitar
 John Barlow Jarvis - piano
 Brent Mason - electric guitar
 Bobby Ogdin - keyboards
 Tom Robb - bass guitar
 John Wesley Ryles - background vocals
 Hank Singer - fiddle
 Harry Stinson - background vocals
 Billy Joe Walker Jr. - acoustic guitar
 Biff Watson - acoustic guitar
 Dennis Wilson - background vocals
 Lonnie Wilson - drums
 Glenn Worf - bass guitar
 Curtis Young - background vocals

Technical
 Mike Bradley - recording
 Steve Gibson - producer
 John Kelton - mixing
 Marshall Morgan - recording
 Denny Purcell - mastering
 Alan Schulman - recording

Charts

Weekly charts

Year-end charts

References

1994 albums
RCA Records albums
Aaron Tippin albums